Alpha Crucis is the most recent oceanographic research vessel in Brazil, replacing the older  research vessel. It is named after the Alpha Crucis star system that represents São Paulo state in the Brazilian flag.

Acquisition
The vessel was built in 1974, and was originally called Moana Wave. It was firstly owned by the University of Hawaii. In 2010, the Foundation for Research Support of the State of São Paulo funded the acquisition of Alpha Crucis after a fire in 2008 rendered  inoperable. It is now administered by the University of São Paulo.

Projects
The vessel is being used for several research projects in Brazil, in topics such as global climate change and biodiversity.

References

Research vessels
1974 ships
Ships of Brazil